Cheshmeh Qanbar may refer to:
 Cheshmeh Qanbar, Isfahan
 Cheshmeh Qanbar, Kermanshah